Penion marwicki is an extinct species of marine snail or whelk, belonging to the true whelk family Buccinidae.

Description
Penion marwicki is a large, extinct species of Penion siphon whelk.

The extinct species Penion exoptatus, Penion clifdenensis, and potentially also Penion marwicki, may belong to the same evolutionary lineage as the extant species Penion sulcatus. This hypothesis is based on geometric morphometric analysis of shell shape and size for all four taxa, as well as the analysis of morphometric variation exhibited all living species of Penion.

Distribution
Fossils of Penion marwicki are found in the South Island of New Zealand, and are relatively common at sites in North Otago and South Canterbury.

References

External links

 Museum of New Zealand Te Papa Tongarewa, Taxon: Penion marwicki (Finlay, 1930)
 Revised descriptions of New Zealand Cenozoic Mollusca from Beu and Maxwell (1990): Penion marwicki (Finlay, 1930)
 International Fossil Shell Museum: New Zealand Miocene

Buccinidae
Gastropods of New Zealand
Extinct animals of New Zealand
Taxa named by Harold John Finlay